Dommartin is a former commune in the Ain department in eastern France. On 1 January 2018, it was merged into the new commune of Bâgé-Dommartin.

Population

See also
Communes of the Ain department

References

Former communes of Ain
Populated places disestablished in 2018
Ain communes articles needing translation from French Wikipedia
Bresse